
Gmina Kruklanki is a rural gmina (administrative district) in Giżycko County, Warmian-Masurian Voivodeship, in northern Poland.

Villages
Gmina Kruklanki contains the villages and settlements of Boćwinka, Borki, Brożówka, Budziska Leśne, Chmielewo, Czarcia Góra, Grądy Kruklaneckie, Jasieniec, Jeziorowskie, Jurkowo, Kamienna Struga, Knieja Łuczańska, Kruklanki, Lipowo, Majerka, Możdżany, Podleśne, Sołtmany, Wolisko, Żabinka, Żywki, Żywki Małe and Żywy.

Neighbouring gminas
Gmina Kruklanki is bordered by the gminas of Banie Mazurskie, Giżycko, Kowale Oleckie, Pozezdrze, Świętajno and Wydminy.

References
Polish official population figures 2006

Kruklanki
Giżycko County